Min Hye-Sook (born March 15, 1970) is a South Korean team handball player and Olympic champion. She competed at the 1992 Summer Olympics in Barcelona, where she received a gold medal with the Korean national team.

References

External links

1970 births
Living people
South Korean female handball players
Olympic handball players of South Korea
Handball players at the 1992 Summer Olympics
Olympic gold medalists for South Korea
Olympic medalists in handball
Medalists at the 1992 Summer Olympics
20th-century South Korean women